The High Commissioner of the United Kingdom to Malawi is the United Kingdom's foremost diplomatic representative to the Republic of Malawi, and head of the UK's diplomatic mission in Malawi.

As fellow members of the Commonwealth of Nations, the United Kingdom and Malawi exchange High Commissioners rather than ambassadors.

List of heads of mission

High Commissioners to Malawi

1964–1967: David Cole
1967–1971: Thomas Tull
1971–1973: Robin Haydon
1973–1977: Kenneth Ritchie
1977–1979: Michael Scott
1980–1983: William Peters
1983–1987: Henry Brind
1987–1990: Denis Osborne
1990–1993: Nigel Wenban-Smith
1993–1998: John Martin
1998–2001: George Finlayson
2001–2004: Norman Ling
2004–2006: David Pearey
2006–2009: Richard Wildash
2009–2011: Fergus Cochrane-Dyet (expelled 2011)
2011–2012:Kirk Hollingsworth (chargé d'affaires)
2012–2016: Michael Nevin
2016: Simon Mustard (temporary)
January 2017-2020: Holly Tett

2020–: David Beer

References

External links
UK and Malawi, gov.uk

Malawi
 
United Kingdom
Malawi and the Commonwealth of Nations
United Kingdom and the Commonwealth of Nations